I Want to Be a Pilot is a 2006 award-winning Kenyan - Mexican short film docufiction written and directed by Diego Quemada-Diez. The movie has earned more than 50 international prizes, including the Audience Award at the Los Angeles Film Festival and has participated in over 200 film festivals such as Sundance, Locarno, Telluride, Edinburgh, Amiens, Los Angeles, São Paulo, Manhattan, Silverdocs, Bermuda, San Francisco.

Plot 
The short film story tells about dreams of Omondi, a young orphan boy living in the slums of Kenya’s capital. A powerful and poetic filmic protest from a member of the crew that made The Constant Gardener. This award-winning Kenyan-Mexican short film documentary shows a poverty-stricken boy in one of the poorest parts of Kenya who looks up towards the heavens and dreams of being an airline pilot, of being able to fly.

Cast
 Joseph Kyalo Kioko   
 Kepha Onduru   
 Collins Otieno ... Omondi 
 Gaudencia Ayuma Schichenga

See also 
 List of Kenyan films

References

External links
 
 www.iwantobeapilot.com

2006 films
Mexican short documentary films
Documentary films about aviation
2006 short documentary films
Kenyan documentary films
Kenyan short films
2000s English-language films
2000s Mexican films